Josiah Ng Onn Lam (born 2 February 1980) is a retired Malaysian professional track cyclist.

Josiah was the first Malaysian to make it into the cycling Olympic finals becoming a three-time Olympian, representing Malaysia at Athens 2004, Beijing 2008 and London 2012.  In 2004 he was awarded the Malaysian Olympian and Sportsman of the Year after being the 1st Malaysian cyclist to make a final in cycling at the 2004 Athens Olympics. In 2010 Josiah won gold at the Commonwealth Games, New Delhi in Keirin at age 30.

He is known to have put Malaysia on the map as one of the best countries for developing world-class track cyclists.

In 2008, he became the first non-Australian to win the 72nd Melbourne Cup on Wheels at the Melbourne Arena.

Early life 
Josiah had loved cycling since the young age of five years old, as it represented freedom for him.

At age 14, he eventually realised his dreams and bought a used racing bike for US$250. He entered his first criterium racing at age 15. Josiah comes from a very traditional Chinese family and didn't get the support of his parents in his chosen career path.  He would often sneak out of the house when they had gone to sleep to walk to where his bike was stored 4 km away.  At age 18, his father asked him to leave home and wished him luck with his endeavours.  He survived by taking on odd jobs where he could, including teaching violin.

At age 20 he represented Malaysia for the first time at the Asian Championships in Shanghai.

Cycling career 
In 2002, Josiah applied for an IOC scholarship to train at the World Cycling Centre in Switzerland under world-renowned coach, Fred Magne.

In 2008, he became the first non-Australian to win the Melbourne Cup on Wheels at the Melbourne Arena. Ng took the lead with two laps to go in the eight-lap event, clutching his win Australia's dual Olympic gold medallist Graeme Brown, who finished second in the 2000m handicap event.

After his cycling career, in February 2016, Josiah endorsed Malaysian fitness app ‘Fitness In My Pocket.’

Following a social media uproar about a RM10 mock cheque prize for a local Malaysian cycling event for children, Josiah chimed in about his entire journey that there is more to cycling competitively than winning prize money.

Retirement 
In 2015 Josiah retired from competition at age 35 announcing at the 2014 UCI Track Cycling Asian Championships in Korat, Thailand that the 2015 World Championships would be his last outing in the sport.

Josiah's last race was at the World Track Cycling Championships in Paris in February 2015.

Accidents 
Four months before he was due to compete at the Athens Olympics 2004, Josiah endured a crash in which he broke his wrist, teeth, nose and lost a lot of blood. He was in the intensive care unit for several days.

On 30 March 2007, Josiah broke his collarbone in a nasty crash in the first round of the Keirin event at the World Track Cycling Championships in Mallorca Spain. He was stretchered off the piste and taken to the hospital immediately and was ruled out of the competition after Italian Roberto Chiappa cut into his path and knocked him down.

During the UCI Track Cycling World Cup in Mexico Dec 2013 Josiah endured another severe crash in which suffered a punctured lung (Pneumothorax), broken collarbone (same one in Mallorca, Spain April 2007 during the World Championships), 2 broken ribs and a concussion.

Achievements 
2002
Asian Games (Busan, South Korea) – Silver Medallist
2004
Olympic Games – 5th in Keirin
2005
Japan International Keirin Invitational - Three 1st place wins
Nestors Keirin Cup (Penn State, USA) – 1st
Festival of Speed Sprint Tournament (Penn State, USA)- 1st
International Fastest Man on Wheels, (Penn State, USA) – 2nd
2006
UCI World Cup, Manchester, UK, – Bronze Medallist
UCI World Cup, Los Angeles, USA, – 5th
UCI World Cup, Sydney, Australia,  – 2nd
Crowned UCI World Cup Champion in Sydney, Australia on 3 March
Asian Games (Doha, Qatar) – 2nd in Keirin
2007
Sid Patterson GP in Melbourne, Australia on  – 1 February in Sprints; 3rd in Keirin
International Fastest Man on Wheels, (Penn State, USA),  – 3 June
San Jose American Velodrome Challenge (AVC),  – 1 July in Keirin, Team Sprint and Sprint.
2009
UCI World Cup, Melbourne, Australia, – Bronze in Keirin
Revolution 5th Austral Wheelrace, 16 December, Melbourne Arena, Melbourne, Australia, Track – 1st Sprint; 2nd Keirin
2010
Revolution 6th Austral Wheelrace, 27 February, Darebin International Centre, Melbourne, Australia, Track – 2nd Sprint
Commonwealth Games, 6 October, New Delhi – 1st Keirin
2010 Asian Games, 17 November, Guangzhou – 2nd Keirin
2011
Sydney International Sprint Grand Prix -1st Keirin
Asian Cycling Championships - 2nd Keirin
2012
Asian Cycling Championships - 1st Keirin
Cologne International Sprint Grand Prix -1st Keirin
Tasmanian Christmas Carnival - 1st Latrobe 2000m Handicap
2013
Asian Cycling Championships - 1st Keirin
Asian Cycling Championships - 1st Sprints
World Championships - 12th Keirin
Wangaretta Cycling Carnival - 1st 1000m Handicap

Awards 
 2004 Malaysian Olympian of the Year 
 2004 Malaysian Sportsman of the Year
 UCI Track World Cup Ranking
 Keirin Year 2002 to 2003 – Ranked No.1
 Keirin Year 2004 to 2005 – Ranked No. 3
 Keirin Year 2005 – 2006 – Ranked No.1
 9 times World Cup Medalist
 Nominee of "Most Outstanding Youth of the Year 2007" AYA Awards

Sponsors 
Josiah's sponsors were National Sports Council of Malaysia, 5bling.com, Nike, Euro-Asia Imports, Oakley and RBC Sport.

In 2006, Josiah signed a sponsorship deal with FedEx Express.  In 2008, after much exposure from the FedEx sponsorship, Josiah was approached by Nike and was subsequently featured on the Damansara Heights billboard for a month during Beijing Olympics 2008. In that same year also, Josiah was featured in a media advertorial that saw him endorsing the advantages of using Nivea for men.

References

External links 
 
  (2002: sprint, team sprint; 2006: sprint)
  (2006: team sprint)
  (2006: keirin)
  (2010: sprint, team sprint, keirin)
  (2014: time trial, team sprint, keirin)

1980 births
Living people
People from Manila
Malaysian male cyclists
Olympic cyclists of Malaysia
Cyclists at the 2004 Summer Olympics
Cyclists at the 2008 Summer Olympics
Commonwealth Games gold medallists for Malaysia
Commonwealth Games bronze medallists for Malaysia
Commonwealth Games medallists in cycling
Cyclists at the 2002 Commonwealth Games
Cyclists at the 2006 Commonwealth Games
Cyclists at the 2010 Commonwealth Games
Cyclists at the 2014 Commonwealth Games
Asian Games silver medalists for Malaysia
Asian Games bronze medalists for Malaysia
Asian Games medalists in cycling
Cyclists at the 2002 Asian Games
Cyclists at the 2006 Asian Games
Cyclists at the 2010 Asian Games
Cyclists at the 2014 Asian Games
Medalists at the 2002 Asian Games
Medalists at the 2006 Asian Games
Medalists at the 2010 Asian Games
Medalists at the 2014 Asian Games
Southeast Asian Games medalists in cycling
Southeast Asian Games gold medalists for Malaysia
Competitors at the 2007 Southeast Asian Games
Malaysian people of Cantonese descent
Malaysian Christians
Medallists at the 2010 Commonwealth Games